Sandhills is a proposed tram stop on the Bury Line and Oldham and Rochdale Line of Greater Manchester's Metrolink light rail system. It would be located in Collyhurst  between the Victoria and Queens Road stops, to the north of the city centre.

Status
The stop is a proposal in the Greater Manchester Transport Strategy 2040.

References 

 

Proposed Manchester Metrolink tram stops